Ikebukuro West Gate Park aired on TBS in Japan from April to June 2000 to high ratings. Much of the story was dramatically altered in the graphic novel adaptation for the series, with some characters being changed slightly or removed entirely and some changes to the story arcs to reflect this.

IWGP (TV)

Trivia

The title of the every episode is a play on words 
 Episode 1 (Ichi): Strawberry (Ichigo)
 Episode 2 (Ni): Carrot (Ninjin)
 Episode 3 (San/Mi): Mandarin Orange (Mikan)
 Episode 4 (Yon/Shi): Shiitake Mushroom
 Episode 5 (Go): Gorilla
 Episode 6 (Roku): TBS
Ch6 is TBS in Tokyo area
 Episode 7 (Nana/Shichi): Youshichi
 Episode 8 (Hachi): Youhachi
Youshichi Shimada and Youhachi Shimada are a famous comedian over in Japan.
 Episode 9 (Kyū): Kyushu Island
 Episode 10 (Jū): Jutte
 Episode 11 (Jūichi): Samurai 
十一(Jūichi) looks like a 士(Samurai).

Ikebukuro West Gate Park